Brian Gaffney (born October 3, 1970) is an American professional golfer.

Gaffney made the cut at the 2015 PGA Championship. He was the only club pro to make the cut and the first since 2011.

Gaffney was the head professional at Quaker Ridge Golf Club in Scarsdale, New York. He is currently the head professional at Essex Fells Country Club in Essex Fells, New Jersey.

Professional wins
2001 South Florida PGA Championship
2002 The Clambake at Rockaway River
2004 PGA Winter Stroke Play Championship
2005 New Jersey PGA Match Play Championship
2008 Charity Classic
2010 New Jersey State Open, The Clambake at Rockaway River
2011 New Jersey PGA Match Play Championship
2012 New Jersey PGA Championship, Charity Classic
2013 New Jersey PGA Match Play Championship
2015 Metropolitan PGA Team Championship

Results in major championships

Note: Gaffney never played in the Masters Tournament nor The Open Championship.

CUT = missed the half-way cut

U.S. national team appearances
PGA Cup: 2000 (winners)

References

American male golfers
Golfers from New Jersey
Sportspeople from Summit, New Jersey
1970 births
Living people